The National Assistance Board was established by the National Assistance Act 1948 and abolished in by the Ministry of Social Security Act 1966. It was preceded by the Unemployment Assistance Board (known from 1941 as the Assistance Board) and succeeded by the Supplementary Benefit Commission.

There was a separate National Assistance Board of Northern Ireland.

The National Assistance Act 1946 required local authorities, under the control of the board, to provide residential accommodation for older and disabled people ‘in need of care and attention which is not otherwise available to them’. They were also able to register and inspect homes run by charitable (non-profit) and private (for profit) organizations and to contribute to independent organisations providing ‘recreation or meals for old people’ or themselves provide these, or day centres, clubs etc.

Staff
Sir Harold Fieldhouse was Secretary of the Board from 1948 until 1959 when he was succeeded by Sir Donald Sargent. The Under-Secretary from 1946–1950 was Hubert Bentliff.

Public depiction
In 1970 the Brighton Combination, of which Jim Carter was a member presented The NAB Show, a politically orientated account of the Board.

Chairs
 George Buchanan 1948–1953
 Geoffrey Hutchinson MP 1954–1964

Other members
 William Asbury 1950–1961
 Edwin Bayliss 1961–1967
 H. M. Hallsworth 1948–1949
 Alice Johnston member of the Royal Commission on Local Government in Greater London
 William Leonard 1955–1960
 Mary McAlister 1961–1966
 George William Martin 1948–1956
 Percy Morris 1960–1966
 Harry Pigott 1957–1966

References

Social security in the United Kingdom
1948 establishments in the United Kingdom